Wild Horse Creek is a stream in the U.S. state of Colorado.

Wild Horse Creek was named for the wild horses which roamed along its course.

References

Rivers of Cheyenne County, Colorado
Rivers of Kit Carson County, Colorado
Rivers of Colorado